Barthelme is a surname. Notable people with the surname include:

Donald Barthelme (1931–1989), American writer
Donald Barthelme (architect) (1907–1996), American architect
Frederick Barthelme (born 1943), American writer
Maxime Barthelme (born 1988), French footballer
Steven Barthelme (born 1947), American writer

See also
Brian Barthelmes (born 1983), American football player